Pulvinitidae is a family of saltwater clams, marine bivalve molluscs in the order Pteriida. These bivalves are related to the scallops and oysters. Sixty years later, live specimens were finally discovered on the wing of a wrecked airplane at a depth of over 400 meters.

Genera and species
Genera and species within the family Pulvinitidae include:
 Pulvinites de France 1824
 Pulvinites adansoni de France 1824
 Pulvinites antarctica
 Pulvinites argenteus
 Pulvinites dysporista
 Pulvinites exempla
 Pulvinites lawrencei
 Pulvinites liasicus

References

 

 
Bivalve families
Monogeneric mollusc families